The 2015–16 SK Rapid Wien season is the 118th season in club history.

Background

Background information

Rapid Wien finished the 2014–15 season in second place. Therefore, Rapid Wien will start in the 3rd qualifying round of the 2015/16 Champions League competition.

Pre-season and friendlies

Bundesliga

Bundesliga fixtures and results

League table

Results summary

Austrian Cup

Austrian Cup fixtures and results

Champions League

Champions League fixtures and results

Qualifying rounds

Europa League

Group stage

Table

Europa League fixtures and results

Knockout phase

Knockout phase results

Team record

Squad

Squad statistics

Starting XI
Considering starts in all competitions.

Goal scorers

Transfers

In

Out

References

Rapid Wien
SK Rapid Wien seasons